The 2014–15 season is Fleetwood Town's first season in the Football League One following promotion via the 2014 Football League play-offs.

Transfers

In

Loaned In

Out

Loaned Out

Match details

Pre-season

League One

League table

Matches
The fixtures for the 2014–15 season were announced on 18 June 2014 at 9am.

FA Cup

The draw for the first round of the FA Cup was made on 27 October 2014.

League Cup

The draw for the first round was made on 17 June 2014 at 10am. Fleetwood Town were drawn at away to Rotherham United.

Football League Trophy

References

2014-15
2014–15 Football League One by team